This is a list of compositions by Henry Litolff.

Orchestral 

Concerto Symphonique No.1 for piano and orchestra in D minor  [lost]
Concerto Symphonique No.2 for piano and orchestra in B minor, Op. 22 (1844)
 Rêve d’un captif, for violin and orchestra, Op. 41
 Eroica, concerto symphonique for violin and orchestra, Op. 42 (c.1846)
Concerto Symphonique No.3 (National Hollandais) for piano and orchestra in E flat major, Op. 45 (c.1846)
 Rêve d’amour, for violin and orchestra, Op. 53
 Le Dernier Jour de la Terreur (later retitled Maximilien Robespierre), drame symphonique No.1 (later styled Ouverture zum Trauerspiel), Op. 55 (c.1850-52)
 Serenade, for violin and orchestra, Op. 61
 Les Girondins (Die Girondisten), drame symphonique No.2 (later styled Ouverture zum Trauerspiel), Op. 80 (c.1850-52)
 Les Guelfes (later retitled Das Welfenlied von Gustav von Meyern), drame symphonique No.3 (later styled Ouverture heroique), Op. 99 (c.1850-52)
 Chant des Belges, drame symphonique No.4 (later styled Ouverture dramatique), Op. 101 (c.1850-52)
Concerto Symphonique No.4 for piano and orchestra in D minor, Op. 102 (1851–52)
A la mémoire de Meyerbeer, marche funèbre, Op. 116 (1864)
Concerto Symphonique No.5 for piano and orchestra in C minor, Op. 123 (c.1867)

Chamber music 

Piano Trio No.1 in D minor, Op. 47 (1850)
Piano Trio No.2 in E flat, Op. 56 (c.1850)
String Quartet in C, Op. 60 (1851)
Serenade for violin and piano (or cello and piano), Op. 91 (1851)
Piano Trio No.3 in C minor, Op. 100 (c.1854)

Piano solo 

Rondo élégant, Op. 2
Grande Marche fantastique, Op. 3
Rèverie au Bal, grande valse, Op. 5
Fantasia on Rossini's Othello, Op. 6
3 Mazurkas, Op. 17
2 Etudes de Concert, Op. 18
Souvenir de Lucia de Lammermoor, Op. 19
Grande Caprice de Concert de Lucrezia Borgia, Op. 20
Grande Fantaisie-Caprice de Concert de Robert le Diable, Op. 21
6 Opuscules, Op. 25 (published 1846)
3 Caprices en forme de Valse, Op. 28
Moments de Tristesse, 2 nocturnes
Invitation à la Polka, Op. 31 (1846)
3 Lieder ohne worte, Op. 31 [sic]
Die Preußische Post, Op. 35
Invitation à la Tarantelle, Op. 36
Grand Caprice de Concert en forme de l'Étude, Op. 37
Souvenirs de la Pologne, 3 mazurkas, Op. 40
Souvenirs d'Harzburg, Op. 43
Promenade du Soir au Bord du Rhin, fantasia, Op. 44
Feuille d'Album, Op. 50
3 Lieder ohne worte, Op. 51
3 Morceaux caractéristiques, Op. 54
Terpsichore, étude de bravoure, Op. 57
Souvenir d'Enfance, Op. 59
Sérénade, Op. 61
Nocturne, Op. 62
Le Retour, pièce de concert, Op. 63
Elégie, Op. 64
6 Arabesques, Op. 65 (published 1854)
Valse de Bravoure, Op. 66
3 Idylles, Op. 70
3 Aquarelles, Op. 71
La Harpe d'Eole, Op. 72
Ballade, op.73
Souvenir d'un beau Jour, pensée musicale, Op. 74
Une Fleur du Bal, Op. 77 (published 1853)
Chant d'amour, étude, Op. 78
Tarantelle infernale, Op. 79
Spinnlied No.1, Op. 81 (1850)
3 Esquisses musicales, Op. 82
6 Lieder ohne worte, Op. 83
Grande Valse brillante, Op. 89
Romance, Op. 90
Perles harmoniques, Op. 95
Chant du Printemps, impromptu, Op. 96
Bacchanale, scherzo, Op. 97
3 Impromptus, Op. 98
Spinnlied No.2, Op. 104 (1860)
Maitau, Lied ohne worte, Op. 105
Les Octaves, concert piece, Op. 106 (1860)
Valse élégante, Op. 107 (published 1861)
Polka caractéristique, Op. 108
La Mazurka, impromptu, Op. 109 (1861)
Andante, Op. 110
La Chasse, étude de concert, Op. 111
Le Carnaval de Paris, Op. 112
Melodie, Op. 113
Souvenir de Vienne, caprice, Op. 114
Scherzo, Op. 115 (published 1862)
A la mémoire de Meyerbeer, marche funèbre, Op. 116 (1864)
Impressions de Voyage, Op. 117
Neckende Geister, impromptu, Op. 124
Dernière Aurore, Lied ohne worte, Op. 125
Frascati-Valse, Op. 126
Der Abendstern, valse, Op. 127

Choral 

 Ruth et Boaz, oratorio (1869)
 Scenen aus Goethe's Faust, for solo voices, chorus and orchestra, Op. 103 (c.1875)

Vocal 

3 Lieder (O Herz lass ab zu zagen; Wolle keiner mich fragen; Das sterbende Kind), Op. 46
Das neue Lied, Op. 48
3 Lieder (Nächtliche Wanderung; Liebesahnung; Trennung von der Geliebten), Op. 49
3 Lieder (Mein Herz; Abendlied; Einsamkeit), Op. 52
3 Lieder (Widmung; Vergissmeinnicht; Meine Furcht), Op. 58
2 Lieder (Mein Herz allein; Des Schäfers Sonntagslied), Op. 67
Mein Herz ist krank, Op. 76

Opera 

 Salvator Rosa (1845)
 Catherine Howard (1847)
 Die Braut von Kynast, grand romantic opera in 3 acts (1847)
 Le chevalier Nahal, ou La gageure du diable, opera comique in 3 acts (1866)
 La boîte de Pandore, opéra-bouffe in 3 acts (1871)
 Héloïse et Abélard, opéra-comique in 3 acts (1872)
 La belle au bois dormant, opéra féerie in 3 acts (1874)
 La fiancée du roi de Garbe, opéra-comique in 4 acts (1874)
 La mandragore, opéra-comique in 3 acts (1875–76)
 Les templiers, opera in 5 acts (1885–86)
 L'escadron volant de la reine, opéra-comique in 3 acts (1888)
 Le roi Lear, opera in 3 acts (1890) [unfinished]

External links 
List of compositions (in German)

Litolff, Henry Charles